Ruijs or Ruys is a Dutch patronymic surname, derived from the archaic Dutch given name Ruis. Variant forms are Ruijsch, Ruis, Ruisch and Ruysch. People with the surname include:

Anna Charlotte Ruys (1898–1977), Dutch bacteriologist and epidemiologist
Anthony Ruys (born 1947), Belgian-born Dutch business executive
Charles Ruijs de Beerenbrouck (1873–1936), Dutch statesman, Prime Minister of the Netherlands 1918–25 and 1929–33
Cor Ruys (1889–1952), Dutch actor, stage director and comedian
Jos Ruijs (born 1955), Dutch rower
Mien Ruys (1904–1999), Dutch landscape and garden architect
Tini Ruijs (born 1957), Dutch football coach
Willem Ruis (1945–1986), Dutch game show host
 (1894–1942), Dutch director of shipowner Rotterdamsche Lloyd and executed resistance fighter in World War II
, a Koninklijke Rotterdamsche Lloyd-owned passenger liner named after him; known for the hijacking incident under the later name Achille Lauro
 (1809–1889), Dutch shipowner, whose family founded Rotterdamsche Lloyd

See also
Ruijs-Aalfs syndrome
Ruys's bird-of-paradise, named after Theodoor Hilbert Ruys (1880–1942), Dutch merchant and missionary in northwest New Guinea

References

Dutch-language surnames
Patronymic surnames